Mountain Village is a city in Kusilvak Census Area, Alaska, United States, located on the Yukon River near the Yukon-Kuskokwim Delta. At the 2010 census the population was 813, up from 755 in 2000.

Geography
Mountain Village is located at  (62.090075, -163.723936).

According to the United States Census Bureau, the city has a total area of 4.80 square miles (96.3 km2), all of it land.

Climate
Mountain Village has a subarctic climate (Dfc) with short, mild summers with cool nights and long, cold winters. Precipitation peaks during August.

Demographics

Mountain Village first appeared on the 1920 U.S. Census as the unincorporated village of "Mountain." It continued to report as Mountain until its incorporation as Mountain Village in 1967.

As of the census of 2000, there were 755 people, 183 households, and 146 families residing in the city. The racial makeup of the city was 6.36% White, 90.46% Native American, 0.13% Pacific Islander, and 3.05% from two or more races.  0.40% of the population were Hispanic or Latino of any race.

There were 183 households, out of which 56.8% had children under the age of 18 living with them, 46.4% were married couples living together, 21.3% had a female householder with no husband present, and 19.7% were non-families. 17.5% of all households were made up of individuals, and 1.6% had someone living alone who was 65 years of age or older.  The average household size was 4.13 and the average family size was 4.69.

In the city, the age distribution of the population shows 42.4% under the age of 18, 9.9% from 18 to 24, 29.3% from 25 to 44, 13.5% from 45 to 64, and 4.9% who were 65 years of age or older.  The median age was 23 years. For every 100 females, there were 98.2 males.  For every 100 females age 18 and over, there were 96.8 males.

The median income for a household in the city was $31,250, and the median income for a family was $30,000. Males had a median income of $34,375 versus $32,917 for females. The per capita income for the city was $9,653.  About 21.1% of families and 22.2% of the population were below the poverty line, including 30.1% of those under age 18 and none of those age 65 or over.

Education
K-12 students attend Mountain Village School, operated by the Lower Yukon School District. The district is headquartered in Mountain Village.

References

Cities in Alaska
Cities in Kusilvak Census Area, Alaska
Yukon River